Taylor Field, now an industrial park, was an airport and military airfield located near Ocala, Florida. It was closed in 1962 and replaced by Ocala International Airport-Jim Taylor Field.

History 
Taylor Field opened about 1933 as a municipal airport near Ocala. The airport had 2 paved runways, with the longest being the 3,900' northeast/southwest strip. A paved taxiway led to a paved ramp on the north side of the field. It was named Taylor Field after the original donor of the property, James Taylor.

In November 1941, Taylor Field was turned into a basic (level 1) pilot training airfield by the United States Army Air Forces. It was then assigned to USAAF Southeast Training Center (later Eastern Flying Training Command). It later contracted with Greenville Aviation School to conduct basic flying training.

Flying training was performed with Fairchild PT-19s as the primary trainer. Also, it had several PT-17 Stearmans and a few P-40 Warhawks assigned. The flight school also operated two auxiliary airfields in the local area. Over 5,000 cadets received primary flight training at the airport during World War II.

On 8 September 1944, it was inactivated with the drawdown of AAFTC's pilot training program, was declared surplus, and returned to civil control as a public airport until being replaced and closed in 1962. Today, there is little evidence of its existence.((29.1726686, -82.1537900))

See also

 Florida World War II Army Airfields
 29th Flying Training Wing (World War II)

References 

 Manning, Thomas A. (2005), History of Air Education and Training Command, 1942–2002.  Office of History and Research, Headquarters, AETC, Randolph AFB, Texas 
 Shaw, Frederick J. (2004), Locating Air Force Base Sites, History’s Legacy, Air Force History and Museums Program, United States Air Force, Washington DC. 

1933 establishments in Florida
USAAF Contract Flying School Airfields
Airfields of the United States Army Air Forces in Florida
Transportation buildings and structures in Marion County, Florida
Defunct airports in Florida
Airports established in 1933
Military installations closed in 1944
1962 disestablishments in Florida